Morton Street is an MBTA Commuter Rail station on Fairmount Line located on Morton Street (MA 203) in the Mattapan neighborhood of Boston. With two full-length high-level platforms and ramps to the street, the station is fully wheelchair accessible. The station was reconstructed in 2006, with the official reopening in 2007.

History

Service on the Fairmount Line (as the Dorchester Branch of the Norfolk County Railroad and later the  New York and New England Railroad and  New York, New Haven and Hartford Railroad) began in 1855 and lasted until 1944. The service included a stop at Morton Street, originally known as Forest Avenue.

The Dorchester Branch (Midland Route) was reopened as a bypass in November 1979 during Southwest Corridor construction, including stops at Uphams Corner, Morton Street, and Fairmount. Uphams Corner and Morton Street were dropped effective January 30, 1981 as part of systemwide cuts. Morton Street was originally built at minimal cost, with small low-level platforms and staircases to Morton Street. The station was not accessible, since service over the route was intended to be temporary; however, it was popular with residents of the communities the line passed through. When the Southwest Corridor reopened on October 5, 1987, the Fairmount Line shuttle service was retained, with Uphams Corner and Morton Street renovated and reopened.

In September 2005, the MBTA awarded a $6.5 million contract to rebuild the station as part of the Fairmount Line Improvements project. The upgrades included two full-length high-level platforms to make the station accessible, ramps to Morton Street and Flint Street, canopies, and improved lighting and signage. The work was completed on July 17, 2007. In 2014, MassDOT replaced the structurally deficient bridge carrying Morton Street over the Fairmount Line tracks. Alternate accessible entrances to the station from the street were used during the replacement.

References

External links

 MBTA – Morton Street
 Google Map Street View: Flint Street entrance, Morton Street entrances

MBTA Commuter Rail stations in Boston
Stations along New York and New England Railroad lines
Railway stations in the United States opened in 1855
Railway stations in the United States opened in 1979
Railway stations in the United States opened in 1987
Railway stations closed in 1944
Railway stations in the United States opened in 1981